Loris Boni (born 14 January 1953 in Remedello, Province of Brescia) is an Italian professional football coach and a former player. He made 400 appearances in the Italian professional leagues, including more than 200 in Serie A.

After couple of seasons in the third-tier Serie C, he made his debut in Serie A for Sampdoria a couple of months before his 19th birthday. He had an impressive rookie season for such a young player, becoming a first-team regular and scoring a memorable goal in a 4–4 draw against Internazionale. Next season, he was instrumental to the victory away against Torino that helped Sampdoria to avoid relegation.

Soon he moved to Roma, but was not able to maintain high level of play he displayed with Sampdoria. He did not score any league goals during his four seasons with Roma. However, he scored in an important 1975–76 UEFA Cup game that Roma won 2–0 against Östers IF; Boni played all six Roma games in that tournament.

Overall, he played nine seasons in Serie A (202 games, 5 goals).

After retirement as a player, he worked as a coach for lower league teams.

References

1953 births
Living people
Sportspeople from the Province of Brescia
Italian footballers
Serie A players
Serie B players
U.C. Sampdoria players
A.S. Roma players
Delfino Pescara 1936 players
U.S. Cremonese players
Novara F.C. players
A.C. Legnano players
Italian football managers
U.S. Sassuolo Calcio managers
Mantova 1911 managers
A.S.D. SolbiaSommese Calcio players
A.C. Montichiari managers
U.S.D. 1913 Seregno Calcio managers
Association football midfielders
U.S. Imperia 1923 managers
Footballers from Lombardy
A.S.D. Fanfulla players
A.S.D. Fanfulla managers